The River Glyde is a river in eastern Ireland, flowing from County Cavan to County Louth.

Course
The Glyde rises in the town of Bailieborough in Cavan, the upper reaches are sometimes known as the Lagan River, but after the Killanny River joins, exclusively as the Glyde.  Another tributary is the River Dee. The Glyde flows in a south-easterly direction before entering the sea at Annagassan in Louth, site of the recently rediscovered ninth-century Viking longphort Linn Duachaill.

Leisure
The salmon and sea trout season here is from 1 February – 20 August. The Killanny River contain stocks of sea trout and salmon.

The Glyde Rangers Gaelic Athletic Association team, founded in 1926, from Tallanstown in Co. Louth is named after the River Glyde.

References

Rivers of County Cavan
Rivers of County Louth